Scarites is a genus of ground beetle native to the Palearctic, the Near East, North America and North Africa. There are at least 190 described species in Scarites.

These beetles share physical characteristics of the more tropical stag beetles, but are not closely related. Scarites can often be found under loose rocks and boards. If touched, they often "play dead" by folding in their legs and arching their backs. The adult beetles are predators and have been observed overpowering mealworms much larger than themselves.

See also
 List of Scarites species

References

External links

Scarites at Fauna Europaea